The Sutton Block is a historic commercial building in Peabody, Massachusetts.  Built in 1859, this three story brick building is the only Italianate commercial building in Peabody.  It was built by Ebenezer Sutton, a local textile manufacturer.  The building originally had a steeply pitched roof, but this was removed sometime after 1877.  Its first floor facade may also have been compromised by retail-related alterations, but original details may survive under the current finish.  The building was designed to house retail spaces on the ground floor, offices on the second floor, and a social venue (at first the Knights of Pythias) on the third floor.

The building was listed on the National Register of Historic Places in 1985.

See also
National Register of Historic Places listings in Essex County, Massachusetts

References

Commercial blocks on the National Register of Historic Places in Massachusetts
Buildings and structures in Peabody, Massachusetts
National Register of Historic Places in Essex County, Massachusetts